Edward Roberts (1690 – 1752) was a colonial mayor of Philadelphia.

Roberts was born in Wales.  His daughter, Susannah, married Thomas Bond in 1735.

Roberts died in Philadelphia County, now Montgomery County, Pennsylvania.

1690 births
1752 deaths
Mayors of Philadelphia
People of colonial Pennsylvania
Welsh emigrants to the United States